Andrea Hairston (born 1952) is an African-American science fiction and fantasy playwright and novelist.  Her novel Redwood and Wildfire won the James Tiptree, Jr. Award for 2011. Mindscape, Hairston's first novel, won the Carl Brandon Parallax Award and was short-listed for the Philip K. Dick Award and the James Tiptree, Jr. Award.  Hairston was one of the Guests of Honor at the science fiction convention Wiscon in May 2012.

She is the Artistic Director of Chrysalis Theatre and has created original productions with music, dance, and masks for more than a decade. Hairston is also the Louise Wolff Kahn 1931 Professor of Theatre and Afro-American Studies at Smith College.  She teaches playwriting, African, African American, and Caribbean theatre literature.
Her plays have been produced at Yale Rep, Rites and Reason, the Kennedy Center, StageWest, and on public radio and television. In addition, Hairston has translated plays by Michael Ende and Kaca Celan from German to English.

Hairston was born and raised in Pittsburgh, Pennsylvania, where as a teenager she did community organizing work with union, civil rights and antiwar activism.  She lives in Northampton, Massachusetts.

Works

Novels
 Mindscape (Aqueduct Press, 2006)
 Redwood and Wildfire (Aqueduct Press, February 2011)
 Will Do Magic for Small Change (Aqueduct Press, 2016)
 Master of Poisons (Tor Books, 2020)

Short fiction
 "Griots of the Galaxy" in Hopkinson, N. and Uppinder, M., eds., So Long Been Dreaming: Postcolonial Visions of the Future, Arsenal Pulp Press, 2004
 "Excerpt from Mindscape", in Thomas, S.R., ed., Dark Matter: Reading The Bones: Speculative Fiction from the African Diaspora, Grand Central Publishing, 2004.
 "Saltwater Road" in Lightspeed , Issue 62, July 2015
 "Dumb House" in Shawl, N., ed., New Suns: Original Speculative Fiction by People of Color, Rebellion Publishing, 2019.

Articles and essays 

 "'I Wanna Be Great!': How to Rescue the Spirit in the Wasteland of Fame" in Donkin, E. and Clement, S., ed., Upstaging Big Daddy: Directing Theater as if Gender and Race Matter, University of Michigan Press, 1993.
 "Driving Mr. Lenny: Notes on Race and Gender as a Transport to Another Reality, Another Dimension" in The International Review of Science Fiction, 2004
 “Octavia Butler–Praise Song to a Prophetic Artist” in Larbalestier, J., ed., Daughters of the Earth: Feminist Science Fiction in the Twentieth Century, Wesleyan University Press, 2006
 "King Kong" in Duchamp, L. T., ed., The WisCon Chronicles, Vol. 1, Aqueduct Press, 2007
 "Double Consciousness" in Barr, M., ed., Afro-Future Females: Black Writers Chart Science Fiction’s Newest New Wave Trajectory, Ohio State University Press, 2008
 "Lord of the Monsters—Minstrelsy Redux: King Kong, Hip Hop, and the Brutal Black Buck" in the Journal of the Fantastic in the Arts
 "Romance of the Robot: From RUR & Metropolis to WALL-E" in Kelso, S., ed., The WisCon Chronicles, Vol. 4, Aqueduct Press, 2010.
 "Stories Are More Important than Facts: Imagination as Resistance in Guillermo del Toro’s Pan’s Labyrinth" in Duchamp, L. T., ed., Narrative Power: Encounters, Celebrations, Struggles, Aqueduct Press, 2010.
 "Heretical Connectedness: An Appreciative Look at Symbiotic Planet by Lynn Margulis" in Cascadia Subduction Zone, Vol. 1., No. 4, October 2011.
 "Different and Equal Together: SF Satire in District 9" in Journal of the Fantastic in the Arts, Vol. 22, No. 3, 2011.
 "Guest of Honor 2012 Speech" in Vanderhooft, J., ed., The WisCon Chronicles, Vol 7., Aqueduct Press, 2013.
 "Disappearing Natives: The Colonized Body is Monstrous" in Extrapolation, Vol. 54, No. 3, 2013.
 "Dismantling the Echo Chamber: On Africa SF" in Los Angeles Review of Books, 16 January 2014.
 "Ghost Dances on Silver Screens: Pumzi and Older than America" in Extrapolation, Vol. 57, No. 1-2, 2016.
 "What Art Does: 'When the World Wounds' by Kiini Ibura Salaam" in Los Angeles Review of Books, 25 March 2017.
 "It’s Our Time: Women of Wakanda", Los Angeles Times, 8 September 2018.

Plays
 On Display - Do Not Touch (1977)
 Signs of Life (1987)
 The Black Women’s Survival Kit (1988-1989)
 It's Not Too Late (1994), with Pan Morigan
 Dancing With Chaos (1995)
 Strange Attractors (1996, 1997)
 Lonely Stardust (1998)
 Hummingbird Flying Backward (2000)
 Soul Repairs (2002)
 Archangels of Funk (2003-2005)
 Dispatches (2008-2009)
 Thunderbird at the Next World Theatre (2014)

Collections 

 Impolitic! with Notkin, D., Aqueduct Press, 2012
 Lonely Stardust: Two Plays, a Speech, and Eight Essays, Aqueduct Press, 2014

Awards
 2011 James Tiptree, Jr. Award for Redwood and Wildfire
 International Association of the Fantastic in the Arts Distinguished Scholarship Award for distinguished contributions to the scholarship and criticism of the fantastic, 2011
 2006 Carl Brandon Parallax Award for Mindscape, 2010
 Launch Pad—Fellow at NASA-funded Writer’s Workshop, August 2008
 Guest of Honor, Diversicon Science Fiction Convention, Minneapolis, MN, August 2007
 James Tiptree, Jr. Award Finalist for Mindscape, 2006
 Philip K. Dick Award Finalist for Mindscape, 2007
 Older Writers Grant, Speculative Literature Foundation for Exploding in Slow Motion excerpt, 2004.
 NEA Grant to Playwrights, a Ford Foundation grant to collaborate with Senegalese Master Drummer Massamba Diop, and a Shubert Fellowship for Playwriting.

References

External links
 Official website and blog
 Aqueduct Press Bio
 Ambling Along the Aqueduct blog posts
 The African American Literature Book Club Profile
 Worlds Without End Profile
 Smith Alumnae Interview

Living people
21st-century American novelists
American science fiction writers
American fantasy writers
Afrofuturist writers
American women novelists
Brown University alumni
Writers from Pittsburgh
Smith College alumni
Smith College faculty
Women science fiction and fantasy writers
African-American novelists
1952 births
American women essayists
American women dramatists and playwrights
21st-century American women writers
Black speculative fiction authors
21st-century American essayists
Novelists from Pennsylvania
Novelists from Massachusetts
American women academics
21st-century African-American women writers
21st-century African-American writers
20th-century African-American people
20th-century African-American women